3,4-Methylenedioxy-N-ethylamphetamine (MDEA; also called MDE and colloquially, Eve) is an empathogenic psychoactive drug. MDEA is a substituted amphetamine and a substituted methylenedioxyphenethylamine. MDEA acts as a serotonin, norepinephrine, and dopamine releasing agent and reuptake inhibitor.

Possession of MDEA is illegal in most countries. Some limited exceptions exist for scientific and medical research.

Uses

Medical
MDEA currently has no accepted medical uses.

Recreational

MDEA is used recreationally in a similar manner to MDMA (also called ecstasy), however the subjective effects of MDEA are milder and shorter lasting. Alexander Shulgin reported it to be stoning in high doses. Most frequently consumed orally, recreational doses of MDEA are in the range 100 to 200 mg. Infrequently, MDEA is an adulterant of ecstasy pills. Studies conducted in the 1990s found MDEA present in approximately four percent of ecstasy tablets.

Adverse effects

Reported adverse effects from MDEA include the following:

Hyperthermia
Mydriasis
Loss of appetite

Overdose

Reported overdose symptoms of MDEA include the following:

Disseminated intravascular coagulation
Muscle rigidity
Rhabdomyolysis
Convulsions
Tachycardia
Hypotension
Sweating

Chemistry

Synthesis
MDEA is typically synthesized from essential oils such as safrole or piperonal.

History, society, and culture

Alexander Shulgin conducted research on methylenedioxy compounds in the 1960s.  In a 1967 lab notebook entry, Shulgin briefly mentioned a colleague's report of no effect from the substance with a 100 mg dose. Shulgin later characterized the substance in his book PiHKAL.

In the United States, MDEA was introduced recreationally in 1985 as a legal substitute to the newly banned MDMA. MDEA was made a Schedule 1 substance in the United States on August 13, 1987 under the Federal Analog Act.

See also 
 3-Fluoroethamphetamine
 4-Methoxyethamphetamine
 Fenfluramine

References 

Benzodioxoles
Designer drugs
Entactogens and empathogens
Euphoriants
Serotonin receptor agonists
Serotonin-norepinephrine-dopamine releasing agents
Substituted amphetamines